The Poot is a 40-min. documentary film by Elham Asadi about Persian carpets. It was selected and screened at Amsterdam International Documentary Films Festival in November 2009. The Poot won the Jury Award for Best Short at the 2010 Full Frame Documentary Film Festival in Durham, NC, USA.

References
 A Unique Persian Carpet Documentary (Iranian.com)
 IDFA information on The Poot (English)
 Radio Zamaneh interview with Elham Asadi about The Poot (in Persian)
 Full Frame Film Festival winners

Iranian short documentary films
Persian rugs and carpets
2009 films
2009 short documentary films